Ferre Spruyt (born 9 April 1986, in Leuven, Belgium) is a Belgian speed skater (inline skating & ice), and multiple European and World Champion. Together with Bart Swings and Maarten Swings, he forms "Team Stressless", the first Belgian professional top speed skating (inline and on ice) team.

Inline speedskating Top results
 National Champion men's speed inline skating 1 000 m (19 May 12 Brugge)
 National Champion men's speed inline skating (on the road) 10.000 m Fond/elimination (20 May 12 Elewijt)
 World Champion men's speed inline skating (on the road) 5 000 m relay race (September 2012 San Benedetto Del Tronto - Italy)
 2011 European Champion men's speed inline skating (on the road) 5 000 m relay race 
 2010 European Champion men's speed inline skating (on the road) 5 000 m relay race 
 2009 European Champion men's speed inline skating (on the road) 3 000 m relay race 
 2009 European Champion men's speed inline skating (on the road) 5 000 m relay race

References

External links
 

1986 births
Living people
Belgian male speed skaters
Inline speed skaters
Sportspeople from Leuven
21st-century Belgian people